Bart van den Berg (born 25 July 1993) is a Dutch tennis player.

van den Berg made his ATP main draw debut at the 2016 ABN AMRO World Tennis Tournament in the doubles draw partnering Jesse Huta Galung.

References

External links
 
 

1993 births
Living people
Dutch male tennis players
People from Krimpen aan den IJssel
Sportspeople from South Holland
21st-century Dutch people